James B. Munro was a Scottish amateur footballer who played in the Scottish League for Queen's Park as an inside right.

Personal life 
Munro served as a driver in the Royal Field Artillery during the First World War.

Career statistics

References 

Scottish footballers
Queen's Park F.C. players
Year of death missing
Scottish Football League players
British Army personnel of World War I
Year of birth missing
Place of birth missing
Association football inside forwards
Royal Field Artillery soldiers